Maxime Ras (born 14 July 1988) is a French footballer who plays as a striker for Union Saint-Jean.

Career
Ras started his career with Chamois Niortais and made his debut for the club in the 0–0 Ligue 2 draw with Troyes on 18 April 2008, coming on as an injury-time substitute for Ronan Biger. Following Niort's relegation to the Championnat National for the 2008–09 season, Ras made a further 13 league appearances, scoring his first goal for the team in the 2–4 defeat away at Arles-Avignon on 10 April 2009. In the summer of 2009, he left Niort to join US Raon-l'Étape.

Ras spent two seasons with Raon-l'Étape, scoring 10 goals in 52 league matches for the club. He went on to join Les Herbiers in the summer of 2011. Although he made 25 first-team appearances for Les Herbiers, he was released by the club at the end of the 2011–12 season.

Ras stayed in Championnat de France Amateur for two seasons with FC Villefranche, one season with AS Moulins, and one season with FC Mulhouse before signing for Rodez AF on 6 July 2016, where he helped the team win promotion to Championnat National scoring 10 goals in 29 games.

He signed a contract with US Créteil-Lusitanos in June 2018.

References

External links
 

1988 births
People from Chambray-lès-Tours
Sportspeople from Indre-et-Loire
Living people
French footballers
Association football midfielders
Chamois Niortais F.C. players
US Raon-l'Étape players
Les Herbiers VF players
AS Moulins players
FC Villefranche Beaujolais players
FC Mulhouse players
US Créteil-Lusitanos players
SC Schiltigheim players
FCSR Haguenau players
Ligue 2 players
Championnat National players
Championnat National 2 players
Footballers from Centre-Val de Loire